Figgy pudding or fig pudding is any of several medieval Christmas dishes, usually sweet or savory cakes containing honey, fruits and nuts. In later times, rum or other distilled alcohol was often added to enrich the fruitiness of the flavor.

Etymology 
Medieval cooking commonly employed figs in both sweet and savoury dishes.
One such dish is fygey, in the 14th century cookbook The Forme of Cury.

The latter is a 15th-century conflation with a French dish of fish and curds called , meaning "curdled" in Old French. But it too came to mean a "figgy" dish, involving cooked figs, boiled in wine or otherwise. A turn of the 15th century herbal has a recipe for figee:

 has the recipe under the name "fignade" on page 42. Richard Warner's  has it under the name "fyge to potage". Mrs Beeton's Book of Household Management contains two different recipes for fig pudding that use suet, numbers 1275 and 1276.

In popular culture 
Often associated with the original traditions of Christmas, it is most notably referred to in the Christmas carol "We Wish You a Merry Christmas" in the line "Now bring us some figgy pudding!" Figgy pudding is not plum pudding, although it can be considered a precursor to it. It is not as rich, nor as complex in its recipe.

See also
 Figgy duff (pudding)
 Christmas pudding

References

Cross-reference

Reference bibliography 

 
 
 
 
 
  
 
 
 
 
 
 

British puddings
Fig dishes